Pélardon, formerly called paraldon, pélardou and also péraudou, is a French cheese from the  Cévennes range of the Languedoc-Roussillon region.  It is a traditional cheese made from goat's milk.  It is round soft-ripened cheese covered in a white mold (à pâte molle à croûte fleurie) weighing approximately 60 grams, with a diameter of 60-70 mm and a height of 22-27 mm.  Pélardon has benefited from Appellation d'origine contrôlée (AOC) status since August 2000.

See also
 List of goat milk cheeses

References

French cheeses
Occitan cheeses
French products with protected designation of origin
Goat's-milk cheeses
Massif Central